Marie Louise Asseu (November 21, 1966 – December 7, 2016) was an Ivorian actress, director and film producer, better known by her nickname Malou. In addition, she was also the founder of the Limale Festival of Cote d' Ivore.

Asseu also released various albums.

Career
Asseu participated in several television shows in the Ivory Coast, including the RTI channel's "Mon Experience" ("My Experience"). In 2012, she made her debut as a director with Les infideles. She also appeared in:

1989 : Bal Poussière
1995 : Faut pas fâcher
2003–2007 : Ma famille
2008 : Un homme pour deux sœurs
2008 : L'Histoire des copines
2010 : Sah Sandra 
2011 : Le Mec ideal
2012 : Les infidèles

Patrick Achi rumor and attempt on Asseu's life
During 2011, Asseu barely escaped an attempt on her life by a crowd of young people. According to a newspaper, a rumor suggested that she was having an affair with Patrick Achi, the local politician; this rumor led to a mob that was armed with clubs and other weapons to try to get to her with the apparent intention of lynching her. she was, however, promptly rescued by a gentleman. Assou suffered psychological trauma from this event thereafter until her death.

Death
Asseu suffered poor health during the last few years of her life. Several days before she died, she suffered what was described by doctors as a mild stroke and had to be hospitalized. Doctors kept a deep secrecy about her condition despite the public's interest to find about it and several media attempts to obtain information relating to it. Released from the hospital a few days later and believed to be in recovery, she suffered a second stroke on November 17, 2016, which this time proved fatal, dying of it on December 7.

References

1966 births
2016 deaths
Ivorian actresses
Ivorian film directors
Ivorian film producers
20th-century Ivorian actors
21st-century Ivorian actors
20th-century Ivorian women singers
Ivorian women film directors
Ivorian women film producers